James Ledden (died 19 January 1927) was an Irish Cumann na nGaedheal politician. He was elected to Dáil Éireann as a Cumann na nGaedheal Teachta Dála (TD) for the Limerick constituency at the 1923 general election, and died in office.

References

Year of birth missing
1927 deaths
Cumann na nGaedheal TDs
Members of the 4th Dáil
Politicians from County Limerick